1935 legislative election may refer to:
 Greek legislative election, 1935
 Polish legislative election, 1935